Gordan Muratović, better known by his stage name Coco Mosquito, is a Croatian pop composer, songwriter, arranger and guitar player as a band member for Jinx. He and his brother, Berko produced a comeback album of Psihomodo Pop called Debakl. After the break-up of Jinx in 2002, Coco Mosquito turned to music production. He wrote and produced a complete album of Davor Erceg with Rovinan (2004) and achieved high success with the production of eponymous debut album from Natalie Dizdar (2005). He mixed a bonus track of Gibonni with the song "Sebi dovoljna".

Produced and mixed albums
 2000 - Debakl, (Psihomodo Pop)
 2004 - Rovinan, (Davor Erceg)
 2005 - Natalie Dizdar, (Natalie Dizdar)
 2006 - Unca fibre, (Gibonni)
 2012 - 2, (Mayales)

In compilations
 2005 - Porin 2005 Nominees
 2005 - Tulum za dušu Vol. 1
 2005 - Turki party - prvih 10 godina 2

References

External links
 Ekskluzivno, samo za Muzika.hr, Coco Mosquito šokantno priznaje: "Ja sam kao prodavač salate na tržnici!" 

Year of birth missing (living people)
Living people
Croatian pop musicians
Croatian songwriters